In embroidery, couching and laid work are techniques in which yarn or other materials are laid across the surface of the ground fabric and fastened in place with small stitches of the same or a different yarn.

The couching threads may be either the same color as the laid threads or a contrasting color.  When couching threads contrast with laid threads, patterns may be worked in the couching stitches.

Applications

Laid work is one of two techniques used in the Bayeux Tapestry, an embroidered cloth probably dating to the later 1070s. (The other technique is stem stitch.)

Underside couching of metal thread was characteristic of earlier Opus Anglicanum in Medieval England and was also used historically in Sicily and rarely in other parts of Italy and France.
Couching is also characteristic of Japanese metal-thread embroidery and Central Asian suzani work.
Another example of Islamic embroidery is the strong tradition of couching stitch in Palestine. Production centered on Bethlehem and its two neighbouring villages Beit Sahour and Beit Jalla; it was used for wedding dresses and formal wear.

Variants
In couching, one or more threads are laid on the fabric surface and sewn to the fabric at regular intervals.
In couched filling, threads are laid on the surface in a trellis pattern and sewn to the fabric at the intersections.
In laid work or Bayeux stitch, threads are laid side-by-side to fill a shape, then held in place with a thread at right angles to the laid threads. This crossing thread is then couched to the fabric to hold the laid threads in place.
In Bokhara couching or Bokhara stitch, the couched threads are held in place with many tiny crossing stitches, which may be aligned from row to row to produce patterns.
In Roumanian stitch, long satin stitches are each held in place with a small diagonal stitch made in the center.
In Roumanian couching, bundles of laid threads are held in place with Roumanian stitches.
In Underside couching, a heavy couching thread (historically, a stout linen) is brought up from the wrong side of the work, looped over the laid thread, and returned to the wrong side. The couching thread is then given a sharp pull which draws a small loop of laid thread through to the wrong side of the fabric.  Underside couching has the advantages that the couching thread is completely concealed from the front and is not subject to wear.

Stitch gallery

Notes

References
 Caulfeild, S.F.A., and B.C. Saward, The Dictionary of Needlework, 1885.
 Enthoven, Jacqueline: The Creative Stitches of Embroidery, Van Norstrand Rheinhold, 1964, 
 Reader's Digest, Complete Guide to Needlework. The Reader's Digest Association, Inc. (March 1992). 
 Lemon, Jane, Metal Thread Embroidery, Sterling, 2004, 
 Levey, S. M. and D. King, The Victoria and Albert Museum's Textile Collection Vol. 3: Embroidery in Britain from 1200 to 1750, Victoria and Albert Museum, 1993, 
 Weir, Shelagh Palestinian Costume. British Museum. .
 Wilson, Erica Erica Wilson's Embroidery Book, New York: Scribner, 1973.

External links
Illustration of underside couching
Chasuble in Opus Anglicanum, Metropolitan Museum of Art
Couching in Japanese embroidery

Embroidery stitches